Aileen: Life and Death of a Serial Killer is a 2003 feature-length documentary film about Aileen Wuornos, made by Nick Broomfield as a follow-up to his 1992 film Aileen Wuornos: The Selling of a Serial Killer. The film focuses on Wuornos' declining mental state and the questionable judgment to execute her despite her being of unsound mind.

Synopsis
The film focuses on an evidentiary hearing held in February 2003 in Marion County, Florida, which was the site of some but not all of Wuornos' murders for which she was convicted and sentenced to death. It shows the work of the Office of Capital Collateral Regional counsel, led by attorney Joseph T. Hobson, who is both interviewed and featured in the film and who seeks to vacate Wuornos' death sentences. It shows Judge Victor Musleh presiding over these proceedings and assistant state attorney, now judge, James McCune, who defended the death sentences for the State of Florida. Hobson is shown vigorously cross-examining Wuornos' trial counsel, Steven Glazer, aka "Dr. Legal". Glazer was the unflattering subject of a prior Broomfield documentary on Aileen Wuornos, Aileen Wuornos: The Selling of a Serial Killer. It was Hobson's line of attack that the efficacy of his client's (Wuornos') trial strategy was compromised by Glazer's pecuniary and self-promotional aims.

The film climaxes in a final interview with Wuornos one day before her execution. In the interview, she states that she was tortured while in prison and claims that the prison used "sonic pressure" to control or alter her mental state. In a fit of rage, Wuornos rails against a society that she says "railroaded my ass" before abruptly ending the interview. Broomfield comments that he finds it hard to understand how the same person in front of him was deemed "of sound mind" the day before by Florida governor Jeb Bush's psychiatric examiners.

The film concludes with footage of a prison spokesman reading Wuornos' final statement at a press conference after her execution: "I'm sailing with the Rock, and I'll be back. Like Independence Day with Jesus, June 6, like the movie, big mothership and all. I'll be back, I'll be back."

Box office 
The film received a limited theatrical release in North America several weeks after the Aileen Wuornos biopic Monster opened to generally positive reviews. Released on January 9, 2004, on three screens, Aileen grossed $16,158 (an average of $5,386 per screen) in its opening weekend. Playing in six theaters at its widest point, its total North American box office gross stands at just $97,362.

See also
Aileen Wuornos: The Selling of a Serial Killer

References

External links 

2003 films
2003 documentary films
American documentary films
American LGBT-related films
Documentary films about serial killers
Documentary films about women
Documentary films about lesbians
Documentary films about post-traumatic stress disorder
Documentary films about violence against women
Documentary films about capital punishment in the United States
Films directed by Nick Broomfield
Films about Aileen Wuornos
Films set in Florida
2000s English-language films
2000s American films